Peter Hochschorner (born 7 September 1979) is a retired Slovak slalom canoeist who competed at the international level from 1996 to 2017. Competing together with his twin brother Pavol Hochschorner, they are the most successful C2 paddlers in the history of canoe slalom. They retired from canoe slalom in 2018 after the C2 event was discontinued and subsequently switched to wildwater canoeing. They retired from wildwater canoeing after the 2021 World Championships in their hometown Bratislava.

Hochschorner won three Olympic gold medals in the C2 event, in 2000, 2004 and 2008 and one bronze medal in 2012.

He also won fourteen medals at the ICF Canoe Slalom World Championships with six golds (C2: 2002, 2007, 2009, 2010, 2011; C2 team: 2009), four silvers (C2 team: 1999, 2011, 2013, 2014) and four bronzes (C2: 2003, 2006; C2 team: 2006, 2007).

Hochschorner won the overall World Cup title 10 times (1999–2004, 2006–2008 and 2011) with his twin brother, which is a record in any category.

At the European Championships he won a total of 17 medals (11 golds, 3 silvers and 3 bronzes).

He lives in Čunovo, a borough of the Slovak capital Bratislava.

World Cup individual podiums

1 European Championship counting for World Cup points
2 World Championship counting for World Cup points
3 Pan American Championship counting for World Cup points
4 Oceania Championship counting for World Cup points
5 Oceania Canoe Slalom Open counting for World Cup points

See also
List of multiple Summer Olympic medalists

References

12 September 2009 final results for the men's C2 team slalom event for the 2009 ICF Canoe Slalom World Championships. – accessed 12 September 2009.
13 September 2009 final results of the men's C2 event at the 2009 ICF Canoe Slalom World Championships. – accessed 13 September 2009.
2010 ICF Canoe Slalom World Championships 11 September 2010 C2 men's final results – accessed 11 September 2010.

External links
 
 
 
 

1979 births
Living people
Slovak male canoeists
Olympic medalists in canoeing
Olympic canoeists of Slovakia
Olympic gold medalists for Slovakia
Olympic bronze medalists for Slovakia
Canoeists at the 2000 Summer Olympics
Canoeists at the 2004 Summer Olympics
Canoeists at the 2008 Summer Olympics
Canoeists at the 2012 Summer Olympics
Medalists at the 2000 Summer Olympics
Medalists at the 2004 Summer Olympics
Medalists at the 2008 Summer Olympics
Medalists at the 2012 Summer Olympics
Medalists at the ICF Canoe Slalom World Championships
Slovak twins
Twin sportspeople
Sportspeople from Bratislava